Lagocheirus is a genus of longhorn beetles of the subfamily Lamiinae. It was described by Dejean in 1835.

Species
 Lagocheirus araneiformis (Linnaeus, 1767)
 Lagocheirus binumeratus Thomson, 1860
 Lagocheirus cristulatus Bates, 1872
 Lagocheirus delestali Toledo & Esteban, 2008
 Lagocheirus foveolatus Dillon, 1957
 Lagocheirus funestus (Thomson, 1865)
 Lagocheirus giesberti Hovore, 1998
 Lagocheirus integer Bates, 1885
 Lagocheirus jamaicensis Toledo & Hovore, 2005
 Lagocheirus kathleenae Hovore, 1998
 Lagocheirus lugubris Dillon, 1957
 Lagocheirus mecotrochanter Toledo, 1998
 Lagocheirus obsoletus Thomson, 1860
 Lagocheirus plantaris Erichson, 1847
 Lagocheirus praecellens Bates, 1872
 Lagocheirus procerus Casey, 1913
 Lagocheirus rogersi Bates, 1880
 Lagocheirus rosaceus Bates, 1869
 Lagocheirus simplicicornis Bates, 1872
 Lagocheirus unicolor Fisher, 1947
 Lagocheirus wenzeli Dillon, 1957
 Lagocheirus xileuco Toledo, 1998

References

 
Acanthocinini
Cerambycidae genera